The A+D Museum is a museum of architecture and design located in the Downtown Los Angeles Arts District at 900 E 4th Street. Designer and educator Natasha Sandmeier serves as the museum's executive director and Camille Elston is the managing director.

History 

A+D Museum was founded by Stephen Kanner and Bernard Zimmerman in 2001. Kanner was inspired by a similar museum he had visited in Helsinki, Finland.

The museum first opened its doors in January 2001 in the Bradbury Building, located at 304 South Broadway (3rd Street and Broadway) in downtown Los Angeles; a space donated by Ira Yellin. When the Bradbury building was sold in 2003 the museum moved to a temporary location on the Sunset Strip in West Hollywood. In 2006 it moved to 5900 Wilshire Boulevard; across the street from the Los Angeles County Museum of Art. In April 2010, the museum moved down the street to 6032 Wilshire Boulevard. Displaced by the extension of the Metro Purple Line, A+D Museum returned to downtown Los Angeles to a former warehouse in the Arts District in the summer of 2015.

Mission 
A+D Museum was created to promote an awareness of architecture and design in everyday life through exhibits, educational programs, and public outreach to the design community as well as the public in the greater Los Angeles area.

Community 
A+D Museum is an information and education center for design, including architecture, interior design, landscape design, fashion design, product design, graphic design, and film/theater design. It is the only museum in Los Angeles where continuous exhibits of architecture and design are on view.  Through exhibits, symposia, multi-disciplinary projects, educational and community programming, A+D serves as a showcase for the work of important regional, national, and international designers, providing a forum for contemporary issues in architecture, urbanism, and design.

A+D Museum is also home to the Stephen Kanner Education Center for Architecture and Design which partners with various organizations throughout Los Angeles to provide students with opportunities for learning, growth, and mentorship. This center serves as a venue for student work, special critiques, charrettes, lectures, movie screenings and ongoing education workshops, including A+D's ARkidECTURE + design program. Partnerships have included Heart of Los Angeles), St. Elmo's Village, the Craft Contemporary, Petersen Automotive Museum and Broodwork.

Background 
A+D Museum is a non-profit 501(c)(3) organization funded by public donations, government and private foundation grants, and corporate sponsors. A+D is a member of the American Alliance of Museums, the International Confederation of Architectural Museums and is recognized by design industry associations such as the American Institute of Architects/LA, the Industrial Designers Society of America/LA and the American Architectural Foundation.

Notable exhibitions 
Key exhibitions define the agenda of the museum and its contributions to the discourse of architecture. 
Some of the A+D notable exhibits include:

 Never Built: Los Angeles (07.28.13 - 10.27.13). An illustration of many major architectural designs that were planned for the city but were ultimately never built. The exhibition, which included models, sketches, and renderings from a number of architects including Lloyd Wright, Frank Gehry, and Jean Nouvel, offered insight into what might have been and challenged Los Angeles' status as a city that promotes architectural innovation.
 After the Flood: Building on Higher Ground (04.18.08 - 06.28.08) featuring an extended update of the exhibition from the US Pavilion at the 2006 Venice Biennale of Architecture curated by Christian Ditlev Bruun showcasing architectural responses to the August 2005 devastation in New Orleans following Hurricane Katrina. The update included a 2008 assessment of the rebuilding of New Orleans and the Pink Project by Brad Pitt and GRAFT for the Make It Right Foundation. On June 27, 2009, A+D hosted the US portion of the international symposia series Sustainable Dialogues bringing together architects, planners, and environmentalists from Asia, Latin America, and the United States.
 34 Los Angeles Architects (11.18.04 – 02.22.05) illustrating the spirit and enterprise of 30 LA Architects and their impact on Los Angeles.
 Public Works: Architectural Designs for the City of Los Angeles (07.15.04 – 09.09.04). Designs for the City of Los Angeles by Los Angeles-based architects. The range of projects reflected the scope of the public investment in the development and improvement of the city.
 Richard Neutra: VDL Research House ll (07.15.04 – 09.09.04).
 Ray Kappe: A Retrospective (11.13.03 – 02.06.04). First major retrospective of influential architect/educator Ray Kappe, founder of the Southern California Institute of Architecture/SCI arc. 50+ years of work in drawings, models, and large format photography by Marvin Rand and Julius Shulman. The A+D Museum produced a Kappe monograph for this exhibit.
 Edward Tufte: Escaping Flatland (11.7.02 – 02.13.03). Escaping Flatland was the first West Coast exhibition showcasing the work of information designer Edward Tufte.
  L.A. Now: shaping a New Vision for Downtown Los Angeles (09.26.02 – 11.30.02). Re-thinking the city and plans for its future in the 21st century.
 3-Ways: 3-Ways explored the themes of scale and communication through a series of projections by 30+ participating architects, designers, and artists. The sheer size of the structures being projected upon creates an immersive experience which draws the audience's attention to architectural themes of scale, 1:1 and detail.
 Cycle & Pattern: a series of four dioramas experienced through multiple framings and perspectives. They tell the story of a playful interaction between the elegance of the celestial and whimsy of the mortal and material. This was curated and executed through a collaboration with Otis College of Art and Design.

Senior staff 
Anthony Morey, executive director and chief curator
Leila Wahba, deputy director and culture curator
Kiana Quan, exhibitions coordinator

Board of directors 
Nancy Levens, Assoc. AIA, Board President
Ryan Hollien, AIA, LEED AP, Board Vice President BD+C
Nicholas Butcher, CFO
Scott Baker, PLA
Duan Tran, AIA
Frank Clementi, AIA
Farooq Ameen, AIA, RIBA
Eder Cetina
Keely Colcleugh
John R. Dale, FAIA, LEED AP
Eames Demetrios
Brian Stewart Esq.
Peter Himmelstein 
Lia Tatevosian

Past board of directors 
Stephen Kanner, Founding Board Member, President In Memoriam
Bernard Zimmerman, FAIA, Founding Board Member, In Memoriam
John Chase, Board Member, In Memoriam

Joe Addo, emeritus 
Xorin Balbes, emeritus 
Christian D. Bruun, MAA, Cand. Arch., emeritus 
Eric Carlson, emeritus 
Bill Fritts, emeritus 
Nancy Harkness, emeritus 
Joseph Hart, emeritus 
Thomas Hinerfeld, emeritus 
Jan Horn, emeritus 
Raji Jaywardene, emeritus 
Cynthia Kanner, emeritus 
Sam Lubell, emeritus 
Dan Meis, AIA, emeritus 
Susan Miller Carlson, emeritus 
Robin Perkins, emeritus 
Gary Schefsky, emeritus 
Stephen Slan, AIA, emeritus 
Jody Turner, emeritus 
Ann Videriksen, Hon. AIA/LA, emeritus

Advisory board 
Ray Kappe, FAIA
Wayne Ratkovich
Julia Bloomfield
Mohan Chandramohan
Judith Kanner
Frank O. Gehry, FAIA
Thom Mayne, FAIA
Richard Meier, FAIA
Eric Owen Moss, FAIA
Dan Rosenfeld
Edward Tufte
Deborah Weintraub, AIA
Adele Yellin

References

External links
 

Architecture museums in the United States
Design museums in the United States
Art museums and galleries in Los Angeles
Museums in Los Angeles
Art museums established in 2001
2001 establishments in California
Mid-Wilshire, Los Angeles